Charles Duane Putnam (born September 5, 1928) is a former American football offensive guard who spent ten seasons in the National Football League (NFL) playing for the Los Angeles Rams, Dallas Cowboys, and the Cleveland Browns. After retiring, he was the offensive line coach for the Atlanta Falcons, Philadelphia Eagles and the St. Louis Cardinals.

Early years
Putnam was born in Pollock, South Dakota and attended Antioch High School in Antioch, California, where he practiced football, basketball and track and field. As a senior, he was a part of an undefeated team and received All-Contra Costa County honors in football, while also winning a shot put championship. 

After graduation, he served in the First Cavalry of the United States Army from 1946 to 1948. He played college football at the University of the Pacific. He was named a charter member of the Pacific Athletics Hall of Fame in 1982, and was inducted into the Antioch Sports Legends Hall of Fame in 2007.

Professional career

Putnam was selected by the Los Angeles Rams in the sixth round (66th pick overall) of the 1952 NFL Draft. During his time with the Rams, he became one of the best guards in the NFL and was specially known for his effectiveness pulling on sweeps. He appeared in five straight Pro Bowls from 1954 to 1958. He was named to the All-Pro team in 1955, 1957 and 1958.

Putnam was selected by the Dallas Cowboys in the 1960 NFL Expansion Draft and became the first starter at left guard in franchise history. On August 15, 1961, he was traded to the Cleveland Browns in exchange for a third round draft choice (#39-Bobby Plummer). In 1961, he played for the Browns and got a chance to block for running backs Jim Brown and Bobby Mitchell. He was released on August 22, 1962. In 1962, he was signed by the Los Angeles Rams to play right guard. The next year, he announced his retirement, after playing eleven seasons in the NFL. The Professional Football Researchers Association named Putnam to the PRFA Hall of Very Good Class of 2016.

Coaching career
After retiring, he was the assistant football coach at Los Angeles Valley College for two years. He also served as an offensive line coach for the Atlanta Falcons, Philadelphia Eagles and the St. Louis Cardinals. In 1974, he served as defensive line coach for the Philadelphia Bell of the World Football League.

Personal life
Putnam's daughter, Pamela Gail Putnam (born 1952), was married to Michael Reagan, the eldest son of former U.S. President Ronald Reagan from 1971 to 1972.

See also
 History of the Los Angeles Rams

References

	

1928 births
Living people
People from Antioch, California
People from Campbell County, South Dakota
Players of American football from South Dakota
Sportspeople from the San Francisco Bay Area
Players of American football from California
American football offensive guards
Pacific Tigers football players
Los Angeles Rams players
Dallas Cowboys players
Cleveland Browns players
Junior college football coaches in the United States
Atlanta Falcons coaches
Philadelphia Eagles coaches
St. Louis Cardinals (football) coaches
Philadelphia Bell coaches
Western Conference Pro Bowl players